Jane Munro (born December 3, 1943) is a Canadian poet. She has published six collections of poetry, including Blue Sonoma, which won the 2015 Griffin Poetry Prize.

Munro was born in North Vancouver, British Columbia in 1943 and raised in Vancouver and North Vancouver. She studied at the University of British Columbia, undergraduate, M.F.A. and Ed.D., Indiana University B.A. and Simon Fraser University M.A. where she worked with poet Robin Blaser. She taught creative writing in several Vancouver universities, and published her third collection, Grief Notes & Animal Dreams, in 1994.

Munro uses a blend of Eastern and Western styles in her compositions. She belongs to the poetry collective Yoko's Dogs along with Susan Gillis, Jan Conn, and Mary di Michele.

She is a proponent of Iyengar yoga and currently lives in Vancouver.

References 

Living people
People from North Vancouver
Canadian women poets
University of British Columbia alumni
Writers from British Columbia
20th-century Canadian poets
20th-century Canadian women writers
21st-century Canadian poets
21st-century Canadian women writers
1943 births